Yunist' Kharkiv is an ice hockey team based in Kharkiv, Ukraine, playing in the Ukrainian Hockey League.

History
The club formed in 2015, and joined the Ukrainian Hockey Extra League prior to the 2015-16 season. The first season, the club ended up at the eight and final place in the regular season.

References

External links
 
 Yunist' Kharkiv Eurohockey.com

2015 establishments in Ukraine
Ice hockey clubs established in 2015
Ice hockey teams in Ukraine
Sport in Kharkiv